Ferrour is a surname. Notable people with the surname include:

Richard Ferrour, English MP
John Ferrour, of the Peasants' Revolt
Johanna Ferrour of the Peasants' Revolt, see Protofeminism